The Connecticut Democratic State Central Committee (CT Dems) is the affiliate of the Democratic Party in the state of Connecticut. Its chair is Nancy DiNardo.

Democrats control both chambers of the state legislature, all constitutional state offices, all five of Connecticut's seats in the United States House of Representatives, and both of its seats in the United States Senate.

Current elected officials

Members of Congress

U.S. Senate 
Democrats have controlled both of Connecticut's seats in the U.S. Senate since 1988:

U.S. House of Representatives 
Out of the five seats Connecticut is apportioned in the U.S. House of Representatives, all five are held by Democrats:

Statewide offices 
Democrats control all six of the elected statewide offices:

State Treasurer: Erick Russell
State Comptroller: Sean Scanlon

State legislature leaders 
Senate President Pro Tempore: Martin Looney
Senate Majority Leader: Bob Duff
Speaker of the House: Matthew Ritter
House Majority Leader: Jason Rojas

Municipal
The following Democrats hold prominent mayoralties in Connecticut:

 Bridgeport: Joe Ganim (1)
 Stamford: Caroline Simmons (2)
 New Haven: Justin Elicker (3)
 Hartford: Luke Bronin (4)
 Waterbury: Neil O'Leary (5)

Notes

See also 
Political party strength in Connecticut

References

External links 
 

 
Connecticut
Political parties in Connecticut